The Camels are Coming may refer to

 The Camels are Coming (book), a 1932 aviation short-story collection set in World War I, the first book of the Biggles series
 The Camels are Coming (film), a 1934 British comedy adventure film set in the desert